The wreathed cactus snail (Xerarionta redimita) is a species of air-breathing land snail, a terrestrial pulmonate gastropod mollusc in the family Helminthoglyptidae. This species is endemic to the United States.

References

Molluscs of the United States
Xerarionta
Gastropods described in 1858
Taxonomy articles created by Polbot